Éamonn Fitzmaurice (born 1977) is an Irish Gaelic football manager and former player. He played at senior level for the Kerry county team and later managed it between 2012 and 2018, during which time he became a member of an exclusive club of people to have won All-Ireland SFC titles as a player and as a manager.

He has been involved in 10 All Ireland wins - 1 minor, 2 under 21, 3 senior All Irelands as a player with Kerry, 1 All Ireland club junior with Finuge, 1 All Ireland junior club as coach with Fossa, 1 All Ireland as a selector and 1 All Ireland as a manager with Kerry.

Since departing as Kerry manager, he has continued to write his renowned column with the Irish Examiner and is a co-commentator and analyst on The Sunday Game on RTÉ

Biography
Born in Lixnaw, County Kerry, Fitzmaurice was introduced to Gaelic football in his youth. He had some success at school level with Gaelcholáiste Chiarraí, while simultaneously experiencing championship successes at underage levels with the Finuge club. An All-Ireland medal winner in the intermediate grade, Fitzmaurice has a unique collection of Kerry novice, junior, intermediate and senior medals with the Finuge club and the Feale Rangers divisional side, captaining and inspiring Feale Rangers to the senior county championship in 2007. Finuge won the All Ireland junior championship in 2005, becoming the first team from Kerry to do so with Fitzmaurice playing an inspirational role from centre back. They beat Stewartstown Harps from Tyrone in the final. As a dual player he also won three county championship medals with the Lixnaw senior hurling team. He also won a Cork County Championship and a Munster Club Championship with UCC as a student in 1999.

Fitzmaurice made his debut on the inter-county scene at the age of sixteen when he first linked up with the Kerry minor team. An All-Ireland medal winner as a non-playing substitute in this grade in 1994, he later won two All-Ireland medals with the under-21 team in 1996 and 1998. Fitzmaurice made his senior debut during the 1996-97 league against reigning All-Ireland champion Meath. He would play a key role for Kerry in defence, predominantly playing at centre half-back during a particularly successful era, and won three All-Ireland medals, six Munster medals and two National Football League medals. He was an All-Ireland runner-up on two occasions.

Fitzmaurice was a member of the Munster inter-provincial team in 2004 but failed to win a Railway Cup medal. Throughout his inter-county career he made 50 championship appearances and 58 appearances in the national football league. Fitzmaurice retired from inter-county Gaelic football on 10 April 2007, still only 29.

On retiring, Fitzmaurice wrote a column for the Irish Examiner. He quickly became involved in team management as a selector with the Kerry senior team under Jack O Connor. An All-Ireland winner in this role in 2009, he later had an unsuccessful tenure as manager of the Kerry under-21 team, a role he fulfilled for one season in 2012, as they lost the Munster final to Cork after an extra-time classic. Fitzmaurice was appointed manager of the Kerry senior team on 27 August 2012, becoming the youngest manager in Kerry's history at 35. At the time it was viewed as being handed a poisoned chalice as Kerry had not won a minor All Ireland since 1994 and had won only one Under 21 All Ireland in the 21st Century in 2008. Many of the successful team of the noughties that reached six All Ireland finals in a row had retired or were on the verge of retirement. He led Kerry to eight major honours in six seasons, including one All-Ireland Championship, six Munster Championships and one National League title. He had an overall win percentage of 64% and had a win percentage of 71% in the Championship. He resigned in August 2018, winning his final game against Kildare as Kerry failed to progress to the All-Ireland semi-finals from the inaugural Super 8 group stage. He is credited with keeping Kerry competitive while guiding them through a transitional period as many legends of the game retired (see table below).

In August 2022, Fitzmaurice ruled out a return to inter-county management and said he could not see himself managing another county team against Kerry.

For the 2021 and 2022 seasons Fitzmaurice was coach to the Adrian Sheehan managed Fossa in Killarney.  Fossa were operating at Junior Premier level in Kerry. David and Paudie Clifford play for them. In 2021 they were beaten by near neighbours Listry in the quarterfinals. However 2022 turned out to be a historic year for the club. They were promoted as champions in the county league and won the Junior Premier Championship beating Listry after extra time in the final. They went on to win the Munster and All Ireland junior titles. Fossa beat Stewartstown Harps from Tyrone in the All Ireland Final in Croke Park.

Personal life
A teacher of history at the co-educational school Pobalscoil Chorca Dhuibhne in Dingle since 2001, he succeeded the long-serving Pádraig Firtéar as principal in 2018. He has successfully managed at a variety of levels in the school as they continue to overachieve with a school population of just under 400 pupils.

He is married to Tina and is the father of two children.

Career statistics

Player

Manager

Kerry player retirements and championship debuts under Éamonn Fitzmaurice

Honours

Player
University College Cork
Munster Senior Club Football Championship (1): 1999
Cork Senior Football Championship (1): 1999
All Ireland Freshers Championship (1): 1996
Higher Education League - Division 1 (1) : 1996

Finuge
Munster Intermediate Club Football Championship (1): 2012
Kerry Intermediate Football Championship (1): 2012
All-Ireland Junior Club Football Championship (1): 2005
Munster Junior Club Football Championship (2): 2002, 2004
Kerry Junior Football Championship (2): 2002, 2004
Kerry Novice Football Championship (1): 1996
North Kerry Football Championship (3): 1996, 2001, 2011

Lixnaw
Kerry Senior Hurling Championship (3): 1999, 2005, 2007

Feale Rangers
Kerry Senior Football Championship (1): 2007
U21 Kerry Kerry Football Championship (2): 1997, 1998

Kerry
All-Ireland Minor Football Championship (1): 1994
All-Ireland Under 21 Football Championship (2): 1996, 1998
All-Ireland Senior Football Championship (3): 2000, 2004, 2006
Munster Senior Football Championship (6): 1998, 2000, 2001, 2003, 2004, 2005
National Football League (2): 2004, 2006

Coach / Selector
Kerry
All-Ireland Senior Football Championship (1): 2009
Munster Senior Football Championship (1): 2010
National Football League (1): 2009
Fossa
All-Ireland Junior Football Championship (1): 2022
Munster Junior Football Championship (1): 2022
Kerry Junior Premier Football Championship (1): 2022

Manager
Pobalscoil Chorca Dhuibhne
Hogan Cup (2): 2014, 2015
Corn Uí Mhuirí (6): 2012, 2013, 2014, 2015, 2018, 2019
O Sullivan Cup (2): 2012, 2018
Paul McGirr Cup - U16.5 All Ireland (1): 2017
Russell Cup (3) - 2009, 2010, 2011 
Frewen Cup (2) - 2012, 2017
Moran Cup (2) - 2011, 2012 
Dunloe Cup (1) - 2011
Bandon Cup (2) - 2008, 2009

Kerry
All-Ireland Senior Football Championship (1): 2014
National Football League (1): 2017
Munster Senior Football Championship (6): 2013, 2014, 2015, 2016, 2017, 2018
McGrath Cup (2): 2013, 2017

References

1977 births
Living people
Dual players
Fingue Gaelic footballers
Gaelic football managers
Gaelic football selectors
Gaelic games writers and broadcasters
Heads of schools in Ireland
Irish Examiner people
Kerry inter-county Gaelic footballers
Lixnaw hurlers
Munster inter-provincial Gaelic footballers
UCC Gaelic footballers
Winners of three All-Ireland medals (Gaelic football)